Odo Botnia (died 1399) was the fourteenth potestaat (or elected governor) of Friesland, now a province in the Netherlands.

Biography

Odo was the son of Feicko Botnia, a nobleman of Marrum, who lived on the Botnia stins (stronghold or nobles house). He would have been a descendant of the old Odo Botnia, who had built a stins at Marrum by 900. This stins was still inhabited by Helena Botnia in the year 1708. She was the last of the Botnia family. Unlike his predecessors, he belonged to the party of Vetkopers.

Odo would unflinchingly and "kloekmoedig", but have been a cruel soldier, who, with his brother-in-law Jackla Jeppema, fear spread among the Schieringers (a rival faction). With the withdrawal from the Foswerd, Odo by way of murders, fires and looting inflicted much harm on the Schieringers in Westergo.

Menaldumer mieden

The Schieringers Sytse Dekama and Gale Hania returned after seven years of service abroad with  foreign powers. When they returned they found their two stinses at Weidum destroyed by Vetkopers. This was the reason for the battle between the Menaldumer mieden Marssum and Dronrijp, which took place on August 18, 1397, where Odo Botnia was severely injured.

He was preceded by Gale Hania and succeeded by Sjoerd Wiarda.

See also

 Rulers of Frisia

References
 H.G. Cannegieter, Het klooster Foswerd, in: Friesche Volks-almanak voor het jaar 1846, Sneek 1845, Mengelwerk pages 44–58. see digital scan.

Potestaats of Friesland
1399 deaths
Year of birth unknown